Onycholyda is a genus of wasps belonging to the family Pamphiliidae.

The species of this genus are found in Europe and Northern America.

Species:
 Onycholyda amplecta
 Onycholyda atra

References

Pamphiliidae
Hymenoptera genera